Antonowicz is a Polish surname derived from the Antonius root name. It may refer to:
 Anja Antonowicz, Polish actress
 Anna Górnicka-Antonowicz, Polish orienteer
 David Antonowicz, Australian rules footballer
 Izabella Antonowicz, Polish canoer
 Wincenty Antonowicz, Polish Righteous among the Nations

References

Patronymic surnames